Hansen High School is a high school in Hansen, Idaho, United States. It enrolled 141 students as of 2016.

References

Public high schools in Idaho
Schools in Twin Falls County, Idaho